Interstate 164 (I-164) was a spur highway of I-64, between that highway and U.S. Highway 41 (US 41) in Evansville, Indiana. Requested as an Interstate and approved in 1968, the freeway was opened to traffic on August 2, 1990.

On November 15, 2013, the Indiana Department of Transportation (INDOT) announced that  of I-164 would be renumbered I-69, an action completed in late 2014. The highway thereby became part of an extended I-69 whose route will run north from the Texas border with Mexico to the Michigan border with Canada near Port Huron.

Route description
Currently signed as I-69, I-164 was signed north–south as it wrapped around the east side of the metropolitan area and then east–west as it curved to meet US 41. West of US 41, the freeway became Veterans Memorial Parkway, an urban surface arterial which provides a direct connection with Evansville's central business district. The highway paralleled the Ohio River as it passed around the south side of Evansville. About  after Veterans Parkway, I-164 turned north and almost immediately had an interchange with SR 66, locally known as the Lloyd Expressway, which is a mostly limited access surface arterial through Evansville with several at grade intersections. After passing SR 62 (Morgan Ave), the route exited Evansville and continued through suburban area. Near the northern end of the route, SR 57 started a brief concurrency with the Interstate Highway. I-164 ended at a cloverleaf interchange with I-64, and SR 57 continued north as a two-lane surface highway. However, in the mid 2000s, construction of I-69 north of I-64 began, and now continues north on a concurrency with SR 57.

History
On October 18, 2013, the American Association of State Highway and Transportation Officials approved an INDOT request to redesignate  of I-164 to I-69 between US 41 and I-64, pending approval from the Federal Highway Administration. On November 15, 2013, INDOT announced that I-164 would become part of I-69, an action completed in late 2014.

Exit list

References

External links

 Interstate 164 at Interstate-Guide.com

64-1
64-1
164
Transportation in Evansville, Indiana
1
64-1